The 2016 Atlantic Coast Conference (ACC) softball tournament will be held at Dail Softball Stadium on the campus of North Carolina State University in Raleigh, North Carolina, from May 12 through May 14, 2016. The quarterfinals and semifinals will be shown on the ACC RSN's with a simulcast on ESPN3. The championship game will be broadcast by ESPN.

Tournament

All times listed are Eastern Daylight Time.

Broadcasters
Tom Werme & Cheri Kempf (ACC RSN- Early; Thurs)
Tom Werme & Barbara Jordan (ACC RSN-Late; Thurs)
Tom Werme, Cheri Kempf, & Barbara Jordan (ACC RSN- Fri)
Pam Ward & Cheri Kempf (ESPN)

References

Atlantic Coast Tournament
Atlantic Coast Conference softball tournament